Matthias Rudolph (born 6 September 1982) is a German football coach and former footballer.

References

External links

1982 births
Living people
KSV Hessen Kassel players
SV Babelsberg 03 players
German footballers
Association football fullbacks
3. Liga players
Footballers from Brandenburg